The Open d'Orléans is a tennis tournament held in Orléans, France, since 2005. The event is part of the ATP Challenger Tour and is played on indoor hard courts.

Past finals

Singles

Doubles

External links 

Official website
ITF Search

 
ATP Challenger Tour
Hard court tennis tournaments
Tennis tournaments in France
Recurring sporting events established in 2005